RAF Little Sai Wan was a signals intelligence station in the Siu Sai Wan area of Hong Kong.

History
The station was established by the Royal Air Force as base for 367 Signals Unit in the early 1950s. In 1964, following a review by Sir Gerald Templer, control of the site passed to Government Communications Headquarters. The site was decommissioned and operations consolidated at Chung Hom Kok in 1982.

References

Military of Hong Kong under British rule
Little Sai
Siu Sai Wan
1952 establishments in Hong Kong
1982 disestablishments in Hong Kong